"She Came to Give It to You" is a song by American singer Usher, featuring Nicki Minaj and uncredited vocals from Pharrell Williams. It was released on July 8, 2014, through RCA Records. RCA Records sent the song to US rhythmic contemporary and contemporary hit radio on July 14, 2014. Originally intended to be the second single from his eighth studio album Hard II Love, the song was scrapped from the standard edition track listing, with the track only being included on the Japanese edition of the album.

Minaj first mentioned the video in an interview with MTV, and was licensed to General Mills for its use in a new Honey Nut Cheerios commercial featuring Usher himself, debuting on August 25, 2014. The song quoted part of the lyrical melody of "Just Be Good to Me", a 1983 single by The S.O.S. Band, written and produced by Jimmy Jam & Terry Lewis and "Got to Give It Up" from Marvin Gaye.

Music video
On August 26, 2014, a music video for the track was released. Influenced by the rhythm beats of Haitian Rara bass horn.

Live performances
On August 24, 2014, Usher performed the song with Nicki Minaj at 2014 MTV Video Music Awards. On September 5, 2014, he performed the song live on Today as the closing act of its Summer Concert Series. On September 9, 2014, Usher performed the song live at the 2014 Fashion Rocks. On September 19, 2014, Usher performed the song as part of his headlining act at the 2014 iHeartRadio Music Festival. He also performed the song live as a part of his UR Experience Tour.On October 13, 2014, YouTube personality Bethany Mota and her switch-up partner Mark Ballas performed a hip hop routine to the song on Dancing with the Stars. They received a composite score of 32.

Charts and certifications

Weekly charts

Year-end charts

Certifications

References

Usher (musician) songs
Nicki Minaj songs
2014 singles
Songs written by Nicki Minaj
2014 songs
Songs written by Pharrell Williams
Songs written by Usher (musician)
Song recordings produced by Pharrell Williams
RCA Records singles
Music videos directed by Philip Andelman
Disco songs
Funk songs